Léon Bertin (8 April 1896, Paris – 5 February 1956, Saint-Amand-de-Vendôme) was a French zoologist. He was born in the 14th arrondissement of Paris, and died in the Loir-et-Cher Department of France, in a car accident.

Biography 
He was granted his  in 1917, and his  in 1920. In 1925, he received his doctorate with a thesis entitled  ("Bionomic, biometric and systematic research on sticklebacks (Gasterosteidae)".

Bertin studied under Alfred Lacroix (1863 – 1948) in the  Geology Laboratories of the National Museum of Natural History in Paris, and studied invertebrates under Louis Eugène Bouvier (1856 – 1944). In 1938, after working as a lab assistant at the Faculty of Science, he moved to the Herpetology Laboratory of the Museum, working for Louis Roule (1861 – 1942), who was followed by Jacques Pellegrin (1873 – 1944) on his retirement. In 1949 he was President of the French Zoological Society.

Publications 
Bertin is most remembered as the author of the 1921 work  ("Atlas of Marine Fish, Detailing their Habits and Mysteries, The Life Cycle and Biology of Sticklebacks"). He specialised in deepwater fauna.

Other works include:
  New editions 1980 and 1998.
  Reissued 1930.
  New edition 1979.
  New edition 1979.
 
  New edition 1951.
  New edition 1946.

Taxon described by him
See :Category:Taxa named by Léon Bertin

Taxon named in his honor 
The thread eel Serrivomer bertini is named after him.

References

1896 births
1954 deaths
École Normale Supérieure alumni
French ichthyologists
20th-century French zoologists